The 2003 Finnish Cup was the 49th season of the main annual association football cup competition in Finland. It was organised as a single-elimination knock–out tournament and participation in the competition was voluntary.  A total of 338 teams registered for the competition.  The final was held at the Finnair Stadium, Helsinki on 1 November 2003 with HJK defeating AC Allianssi by 2–1, (after extra time), before an attendance of 3,682 spectators.

Teams

Round 1

Round 2

Round 3

Round 4

Round 5

Round 6

Quarter-finals

Semi-finals

Final

References

External links
 Suomen Cup Official site 

Finnish Cup seasons
Finnish Cup, 2003
Finnish Cup, 2003